Eduardo Miguel Urroz Cuadra (born 7 October 1967) is a Nicaraguan football player and former coach who coaches UNAN Managua in the Primera División de Nicaragua.

Club career
During his career he  played for Diriangén, Juventus Managua and Deportivo Walter Ferretti winning titles at each club.

International career
Cruz made his debut for Nicaragua in the 1988 and has represented his country in  FIFA World Cup qualification matches.

His final international was a July 1992 FIFA World Cup qualification match against El Salvador.

Managerial career
Urroz took charge of UNAN Managua in 2012 and helping them win promotion to the primea division for the first time in their history.

References

1967 births
Living people
Nicaraguan men's footballers
Nicaragua international footballers
Diriangén FC players
Nicaraguan football managers
C.D. Walter Ferretti players

Association footballers not categorized by position